Janet Mary Simpson (2 September 1944 – 14 March 2010) was a British athlete who competed in sprint events and the 400 metres.

She competed for Great Britain in the 1964 Summer Olympics held in Tokyo, Japan in the 4 x 100 metres relay, where she won the bronze medal with her team-mates Mary Rand, Daphne Arden and Dorothy Hyman.

She emulated her mother, Violet Webb, who had won bronze in the same event at the 1932 Summer Olympics in Los Angeles.

Simpson competed for England in the 1966 Commonwealth Games held in Kingston, Jamaica, in the 4 x 110 yards relay, where she won the silver medal with her team-mates Maureen Tranter, Daphne Slater and Jill Hall.

She finished fourth in the 400 metres final at the 1968 Summer Olympics in Mexico, missing the bronze medal by only 0.32 seconds.

She also was a member of the Great Britain team that won a gold medal in the 4 x 400 m relay at the 1969 European Championships in Athletics in Athens, Greece, setting a world record time of 3:30.8 minutes.  Running the third leg, Janet ran the joint fastest time (52.1) of the British quartet and made up 15 metres on the leader, Eliane Jacq of France.  The other members of that victorious team were Rosemary Stirling, Pat Lowe and Lillian Board.

She retired from athletics in 1969 but made a comeback to compete in the 1972 Summer Olympics in Munich, helping the Great Britain relay squad finish fifth in the final of the 4 x 400 metres in British record time (3:28.75).

She later married the Swiss sprinter Philippe Clerc, 200 m champion at the 1969 European Athletics Championships. She died of a heart attack on 14 March 2010 at the age of 65.

References

External links
 

1944 births
2010 deaths
People from Chipping Barnet
British female sprinters
English female sprinters
Olympic athletes of Great Britain
Olympic bronze medallists for Great Britain
Athletes (track and field) at the 1964 Summer Olympics
Athletes (track and field) at the 1968 Summer Olympics
Athletes (track and field) at the 1972 Summer Olympics
Commonwealth Games silver medallists for England
Commonwealth Games medallists in athletics
Athletes (track and field) at the 1966 British Empire and Commonwealth Games
European Athletics Championships medalists
Medalists at the 1964 Summer Olympics
Olympic bronze medalists in athletics (track and field)
English Olympic medallists
Olympic female sprinters
Medallists at the 1966 British Empire and Commonwealth Games